Sunil Shinde is a Shiv Sena politician from Mumbai, Maharashtra. He is member of Maharashtra Legislative Council from Mumbai local authorities constituency.
He was Member of Legislative Assembly from Worli Vidhan Sabha constituency of Mumbai, Maharashtra, India as a member of Shiv Sena from 2014 to 2019.

Positions held
 2007: Elected as Corporator in Brihanmumbai Municipal Corporation 
 2011-2012: Chairman of Brihanmumbai Electric Supply and Transport
 2014: Elected to Maharashtra Legislative Assembly
 2015: Shiv Sena Sampark Pramukh North Ahmednagar
 2021: Elected to Maharashtra Legislative Council

See also
 Mumbai South Lok Sabha constituency

References

External links
 Shiv Sena Official website

Living people
Maharashtra MLAs 2014–2019
Shiv Sena politicians
Marathi politicians
1963 births